The 2019 TCR Scandinavia Touring Car Championship was the ninth overall season of the Scandinavian Touring Car Championship season, the third under the internationally recognised TCR formula, and the first with its new promoter. The season started at Ring Knutstorp on 4 May and ended at Mantorp Park on 5 October, after six rounds across Sweden.

During the off-season, the national governing body of motorsport in Sweden, Svenska Bilsportförbundet (SBF), was informed on 6 February 2019 that promotor Scandinavian touringcar corporation AB, which was responsible for the promotion of the Scandinavian Touring Car Championship, declared bankruptcy. TCR Scandinavian Series AB, in cooperation with the circuits and SBF, took over as promoter of the STCC-series.

Teams and drivers

Notes

Calendar 
On 31 October 2018, a provisional calendar was announced which increased the events from six events to seven. Five events were confirmed with "midnight sun" race confirmed at the Skellefteå Drive Centre which will make its début. Anderstorp Raceway was confirmed as the second round of the championship on 8 November 2018. Jyllands-Ringen in Denmark was added to the calendar as the sixth round on 26 November 2018. The series last visited Denmark during the 2012 season at the same venue. With the calendar changes the Rudskogen circuit in Norway was dropped from the calendar.

Race calendar and results

Championship standings

Drivers' Championship

Teams' Championship

References

External links 
 

Scandinavian Touring Car Championship
2019 in Swedish motorsport